Dubravko Horvatić (9 December 1939 – 20 May 2004) was a Croatian novelist, poet and essayist.

Biography 

Dubravko Horvatić was born on 9 December 1939 in Zagreb. He finished Classical Gymnasium in Zagreb and enrolled Faculty of Humanities and Social Sciences in the same city. Horvatić wrote over fifty books. He was a member of Croatian Democratic Union. He died on 20 May 2004 in Zagreb at the age of 64.

Works 
Horvatić's works have been translated into 25 languages. His published works are:
 Groznica, Zagreb (1960)
 Zla vojna, Zagreb (1963)
 Bedem, Zagreb (1968)
 Remparts, Zagreb (1969)
 Stanari u slonu, Zagreb (1969)
 Crna zemlja, Zagreb (1970)
 Slike, kipovi, usudi', likovne kritike i eseji, Zagreb (1972)
 Hej, vatrogasci, požurite, Zagreb (1972)
 Reponje, Zagreb (1975)
 Ples smrti, Zagreb (1975)
 Sveti Juraj i zmaj, Zagreb-Tomislavgrad (1978)
 Podravska legenda, Zagreb (1979)
 Zvrkasti kalendar, Split-Tomislavgrad (1981)
 Junačina Mijat Tomić, Zagreb (1982)
 Bašćina, Zagreb (1982)
 Katarina, Maglaj (1983),  Zagreb (2007)
 Hrvatska i druge zemlje, Zagreb (1984)
 Pleter oko slike, Zagreb (1985)
 Dalmacija, Zagreb (1986)
 Zrcala zbilja, Zagreb (1986)
 Grički top i druge legende, Zagreb (1987)
 Dar Gospodara Tame, Zagreb (1987)
 Sveti zrak, Klek-Zagreb (1988)
 Josip Turković, Zagreb (1988)
 Izabrane pjesme, Zagreb (1988)
 Olovna dolina, Zagreb (1989)
 Biser-voda s Manduševca, Zagreb (1990)
 Grički top, Zagreb (1990)
 Zagreb i okolica, Zagreb (1990, 1995)
 Zemlja, jezik, tisak, Zagreb (1990)
 Knjiga o Herceg-Bosni, Zagreb (1990)
 To je Hrvatska, Zagreb (1991)
 Hrvatska, Zagreb, (1991, 1996)
 Ponor, Zagreb (1992)
 Skaska o suživotu, Zagreb - Klek (1992)
 The Contribution of Croatians to Western Culture, Zagreb (1992)
 Hrvatine stoljećima, Zagreb (1992, 1996)
 Đavo u podne, Zagreb (1993)
 Nepostojeći hrvatski pisci, Zagreb - Sisak (1993)
 Ime zla, Zagreb (1994)
 Ježevi u krošnji, Zagreb (1994) 
 Knjiga, rat, domovina, Zagreb (1995)
 Ratna noć, Zagreb (1995)
 Istini u oči, Zagreb (1998)
 Svjetionik, Zagreb (1999)
 Pabirci s poprišta, Zagreb (1999)
 Pleme Kroatana, Zagreb (1999)
 Dr. Franjo Tuđman - sinteza teorije i prakse, Zagreb (1999)
 Pravo na ljubav, pravo na smrt, Zagreb (2000)
 Hrvatska na stratištu, Zagreb (2001)
 Neprohodne magle, Zagreb (2001)
 Crne zastave, Zagreb (2001)
 U gostima kod ljudoždera, Zagreb (2002)
 Od Tuđmana do tuđinca, Zagreb (2002)
 Kalendarij hrvatske groteske, Zagreb (2003).

References 

Croatian writers
Croatian children's writers
Croatian Democratic Union politicians
Writers from Zagreb
1939 births
2004 deaths
Burials at Mirogoj Cemetery